James Fulton (born 9 October 1992) is an Irish rally co-driver. He is set to co-drive with Craig Breen for M-Sport Ford since the 2022 Rally Japan, replacing Paul Nagle.

Rally results

WRC results
 
* Season still in progress.

References

External links
 James Fulton's e-wrc profile

1992 births
Living people
Irish co-drivers
World Rally Championship co-drivers